USS Greeneville is a  nuclear-powered attack submarine (SSN), and the only vessel in United States Navy history to be named after Greeneville, Tennessee. The contract to build the boat was awarded to Newport News Shipbuilding and Dry Dock Company in Newport News, Virginia, on 14 December 1988, and her keel was laid down on 28 February 1992. She was launched on 17 September 1994, sponsored by Tipper Gore, and commissioned on 16 February 1996.

Greeneville had a deadly collision with a Japanese fishing vessel, Ehime Maru, off the coast of Oahu in February 2001.

Namesake
She was named after Greeneville, the home of 17th United States President Andrew Johnson, after local residents, businesses such as Greeneville Metal Manufacturing, which builds submarine components, and government officials began a campaign for a submarine to be named after their town, rather than a large metropolitan area.

Boat's history

The Ehime Maru incident

On 9 February 2001, while conducting a main ballast tank blow off the coast of Oahu while hosting several civilian "distinguished visitors", mainly donors to the Battleship Missouri Memorial, Greeneville struck the 191-foot (58 m) Japanese fishery high school training ship Ehime Maru (えひめ丸), causing the fishing boat to sink in less than ten minutes with the death of nine crew members, including four high school students. The commander of Greeneville, Commander Scott Waddle, accepted full responsibility for the incident. However, after he faced a court of inquiry, it was decided a full court-martial would be unnecessary and opted for a non-judicial punishment; Commander Waddle's request to retire was approved for 1 October 2001 with an honorable discharge.

The Saipan incident
On 27 August 2001, Greeneville ran aground while entering port in Saipan on a routine Western Pacific deployment. The boat's underside, rudder, and propulsion train suffered minor damage; repairs required drydocking and a significant delay in the remainder of her deployment.  The boat's commanding officer, Commander David Bogdan, was relieved of command, and the navigator and assistant navigator were also removed from their duties. In addition, the navigator and the sub's executive officer, Lieutenant Commander Gerald Pfieffer, were found guilty of "hazarding a vessel" during an admiral's mast, conducted by Rear Admiral Joseph Enright, Commander, Submarine Group Seven.

USS Ogden collision
On 27 January 2002, less than a year after colliding with Ehime Maru and five months after running aground, Greeneville collided with  during a personnel transfer off the coast of Oman, opening a 5 by 18 inch (130 by 460 mm) hole in one of Ogdens fuel tanks and spilling several thousand gallons of fuel. After the collision, both vessels left the area under their own power.

Post-2002 service
Following the investigation regarding the collision with Ogden, Commander Lindsay R. Hankins was permitted to remain in command of the Greeneville. Despite the fact the Ogdens commanding officer was fired, Hankins went on to have a successful command tour with his XO LCDR Mark D. Pyle. Capt. Hankins went on to be awarded the coveted Vice Admiral James Bond Stockdale Award for Inspirational Leadership. LCDR Pyle also went on to have the honor of being bestowed with the John Paul Jones award, which recognizes outstanding leadership.

On 9 July 2004, when Commander Lorin Selby relieved Hankins as commanding officer of Greeneville, Captain Cecil Haney, Commodore, Submarine Squadron One, stated that "The performance of USS Greeneville during Captain Hankins' tour has been nothing but remarkable. It has been marked by top grades in both tactical and engineering readiness. Lee Hankins was handpicked by our leadership for the job as CO of Greeneville. They got it right." Hankins was selected for promotion to Captain in 2005 and served as Commodore of Submarine Squadron One (COMSUBRON 1) based in Pearl Harbor, Hawaii. Captain Hankins later served as the Chief of Staff for the Commander, Submarine Forces Pacific.

In October 2007, Greeneville left her home port of Pearl Harbor to conduct a Depot Modernization Period at Portsmouth Naval Shipyard in Kittery, ME. She returned to Pearl Harbor, HI in July 2009. In early 2011, Greeneville returned from a Western Pacific deployment under the command of CDR Carullo.

Awards
Awarded the 2016 "Battle E" award from Submarine Squadron One after a successful western Pacific deployment.

See also 
 Major submarine incidents since 2000

References

External links 

 at Naval Vessel Register
http://archives.cnn.com/2001/WORLD/asiapcf/east/02/11/japan.substrike.02/index.html 

Los Angeles-class submarines
United States submarine accidents
Maritime incidents in 2001
Maritime incidents in 2002
Nuclear submarines of the United States Navy
Ships built in Newport News, Virginia
1994 ships
Submarines of the United States
Greeneville, Tennessee